South China Athletic Association (known simply as South China, SCAA) is a Hong Kong professional football club that competes in the Hong Kong First Division, the second-tier league in Hong Kong football league system. The club is historically one of the most successful football clubs in Hong Kong, having won a record 41 First Division titles, a record 31 Senior Shields, a record 10 FA Cups and 3 League Cups. The club has a very long history in playing in the top-tier league, but decided to self-relegate after the end of the 2016–17 season.

Nicknamed "Shaolin Temple" and "Caroliners", South China has produced many great Hong Kong footballers over the years. In November 2007, the club entered into a charity partnership with Hong Kong Red Cross. The partnership is a pioneer between a sports association and a humanitarian organisation in Hong Kong.

The club plays its home matches at Happy Valley Recreation Ground.

History

Early history

The Chinese Football Team was founded in 1904 by a group of Chinese students in Hong Kong, including Mok Hing and Tong Fuk Cheung (the captain of China national football team in the 1910s). In 1910, the team was renamed as South China Football Club.

In the 1917 Far Eastern Games and 1919 Far Eastern Games (also known as the Far East Olympics Tournament), the club represented the Republic of China and won the football championship. It is the only team in Hong Kong sports history to have accomplished this feat. China lost in the final to the Philippines in the first to be held, in 1913,
but in the next nine it won every time, right through until the last FECG to be held in 1934. On that occasion China was a joint winner with Japan. Throughout these tournaments, the majority of the China team was composed of SCAA players.

In 1920, South China which began as a club called the South China Athletic Association founded by Mok Hing.

Around 1920–1922, the club formally adopted the present name of South China Athletic Association and diversified into other sports such as basketball.

1980s
Since its foundation, South China had a Chinese only policy whereby the club would only field players of Chinese ethnicity. In keeping with this policy, the club would only sign foreign players who had Chinese ancestry such as Edmund Wee, Chow Chee Keong and Chan Kwok Leung.  Up until the 1980s, the policy did not have a negative effect on results.

However, when professional football took off in Hong Kong, the club could not cope with the influx of foreign players and performed poorly at the beginning of the 1981–1982 season. Therefore, on 2 November 1981 the club voted to end its six decade old Chinese only policy. Although the club was able to avoid relegation that season, it was not incident-free.  On 6 June 1982, after the club drew an all-important match with Caroline Hill, the fans rioted outside the stadium that spread onto Causeway Bay.  The riot was the largest civil disorder in Hong Kong since the leftist riot in 1967.

2000s
As they failed to beat Citizen in the last game of the 2005–06 season, South China was to be relegated for the first time since 1983. However, on 14 June 2006, the Hong Kong Football Association approved a request from South China to remain in the Hong Kong First Division with the promise of strengthening their squad. Staying true to their word, South China heavily strengthened their squad and coaching staff. As a result, South China successfully regained the First Division League title in the 2006–07 season, and also winning the Hong Kong FA Cup and the Hong Kong Senior Shield, achieving the famous treble.

The team has gone from strength to strength, while the team has had continued success on the domestic front, winning three consecutive league titles in the process, it has also had success in other international club competitions. The team has reached the semi-finals of the 2009 AFC Cup. South China's success has seen the team climb in world club rankings to their new high of 145th, even surpassing other Mainland Chinese clubs which are widely considered to be of a better standard than clubs in Hong Kong. In recent years the South China has taken part in several pre-season exhibition matches with European clubs, with the most notable being a 2–0 win against the English Premier League side Tottenham Hotspur.

Much of the recent success has been attributed to the former chairman, Steven Lo, and with his shrewd business sense he rebuilt the team as a brand, and played a major role in reigniting interest in the Hong Kong Football League. South China has reinvented their image and have partnered with several organisations and brands. In 2007, South China has enter into a partnership with Hong Kong Red Cross. The partnership is a pioneer between a sports association and a humanitarian organisation in Hong Kong, and South China is the first football team to ever bear the Red Cross emblem on the official kit. The appointment of the fashion brand Giorgio Armani as the official tailor, has allowed South China to join some of the world's elite, with the brand being associated with Chelsea Football Club and the England national team. In celebration of the 100th Anniversary of the establishment of South China Football Team, world-renowned designer Philippe Starck produced a special edition of the "Peninsula Chair", with the faces of the team and the chairman printed on.

Nicky Butt and Mateja Kežman played for South China during the 2010–11 season.

2010s
Ahead of the 2014–15 season, AET chairman Wallace Cheung became the conveynor of the club, promising to spend $18–20 million per season. The domestic season was not initially a successful one as the club finished fourth in the league and did not win any silverware. The saving grace was a Season Playoff victory which allowed the club to directly qualify for the 2016 AFC Cup group stage.

In 2016–17 South China reached their first cup final in six years, facing Kitchee in the 2016–17 Hong Kong FA Cup Final. However, they were defeated 2–1 and were unable to capture the trophy.

On 5 June 2017, South China made the shocking announcement that they would voluntarily self-relegate into the First Division. The club and Cheung had recently parted ways, leaving the club with no financial benefactor to support their large salary budget.

Current squad

First team

Honours
Historically the most popular club in the city, SCAA is also the most successful football club in Hong Kong, winning the Hong Kong First Division 41 times (all-time ranking 1st), the Senior Shield 31 times (all-time ranking 1st), the now-defunct Hong Kong Viceroy Cup 8 times, the Hong Kong FA Cup 10 times (all-time ranking 1st) and the Hong Kong League Cup 3 times. The team had captured all 4 trophies in seasons 1987–88 and 1990–91. In November 2001, the team was awarded the AFC Team of the Month by the Asian Football Confederation.

Domestic

League
Hong Kong First Division
Champions (41): 1923–24, 1930–31, 1932–33, 1934–35, 1935–36, 1937–38, 1938–39, 1939–40, 1940–41, 1948–49, 1950–51, 1951–52, 1952–53, 1954–55, 1956–57, 1957–58, 1958–59, 1959–60, 1960–61, 1961–62, 1965–66, 1967–68, 1968–69, 1971–72, 1973–74, 1975–76, 1976–77, 1977–78, 1985–86, 1986–87, 1987–88, 1989–90, 1990–91, 1991–92, 1996–97, 1999–2000, 2006–07, 2007–08, 2008–09, 2009–10, 2012–13
Runners-up (16): 1928–29, 1946–47, 1953–54, 1955–56, 1964–65, 1966–67, 1972–73, 1980–81, 1984–85, 1988–89, 1992–93, 1994–95, 1995–96, 1997–98, 1998–99, 2010–11

Hong Kong Second Division
Champions (5): 1917–18, 1925–26, 1933–34, 1951–52, 1952–53

Cup competitions
Hong Kong Senior Shield
Champions (31): 1928–29, 1930–31, 1932–33, 1934–35, 1935–36, 1936–37, 1937–38, 1938–39, 1940–41, 1948–49, 1954–55, 1956–57, 1957–58, 1958–59, 1960–61, 1961–62, 1964–65, 1971–72, 1985–86, 1987–88, 1988–89, 1990–91, 1995–96, 1996–97, 1998–99, 1999–2000, 2001–02, 2002–03, 2006–07, 2009–10, 2013–14
Runners-up (16): 1918–19, 1933–34, 1937–38, 1939–40, 1946–47, 1950–51, 1952–53, 1962–63, 1970–71, 1973–74, 1976–77, 1978–79, 1989–90, 1992–93, 2010–11, 2011–12

Hong Kong FA Cup
Champions (10): 1984–85, 1986–87, 1987–88, 1989–90, 1990–91, 1995–96, 1998–99, 2001–02, 2006–07, 2010–11
Runners-up (5): 1975–76, 1985–86, 1997–98, 2000–01, 2016–17

Hong Kong League Cup
Champions (3): 2001–02, 2007–08, 2010–11
Runners-up (2): 2014–15, 2015–16

Hong Kong Viceroy Cup
Champions (8): 1971–72, 1979–80, 1986–87, 1987–88, 1990–91, 1992–93, 1993–94, 1997–98
Runners-up (7): 1973–74, 1974–75, 1984–85, 1985–86, 1989–90, 1991–92, 1995–96

Hong Kong Junior Shield
Champions (9): 1947–48, 1950–51, 1952–53, 1953–54, 1954–55, 1956–57, 1957–58, 1958–59, 1966–67

Hong Kong Community Cup
 Champions (2): 2014, 2015

Hong Kong Community Shield
Runners-up (1): 2009

Hong Kong Sapling Cup
Runners-up (1): 2015–16

Continental record

Recent seasons

Coaches
As of 30 May 2014. Only competitive matches are counted. Wins, losses and draws are results at the final whistle; the results of penalty shoot-outs are not counted.

Key
* Served as caretaker manager.

Partnerships
On 3 November 2009, South China and Tottenham Hotspur jointly announced a club partnership in Hong Kong. South China became the first club partner of Spurs in Asia. The partnership is for 2 years with an option to extend further. Besides planning in sharing of best practice in any areas of the technical and business sides of football, Tottenham Hotspur has the first option on South China players at all age levels. Tottenham Hotspur will support South China's coaching development through the exchange of scientific data, coaching materials and visits of coaching staffs to and from both teams. The two clubs will explore the possibility of a joint youth Academy and training centre in Hong Kong or in mainland China.

Songs

1) 南華歌
A new official cheering song for SCAA. It was introduced in the first home match in the 2006–07 season against HKFC. The demo version of the song can be accessed on www.bma.com.hk.
2) 擁南躉之歌
This is not the official song of South China, and neither was the original official fans' song. It was sung by Albert Cheung 張武孝(also known as: 大Al/Big Al), and became very well known after being released in 1977, especially during late 1970s and the 1980s; during that period South China was a perennial challenger for the top spots in the league, and the song describes how strong and famous the team was.

Notable players

References

External links

 Official Website
 South China at HKFA

 
Association football clubs established in 1910
Football clubs in Hong Kong
1910 establishments in Hong Kong